Barundi are the people of Burundi, or of Burundian descent.

Barundi may refer to:

Burundi
 Burundi
 Demographics of Burundi
 Culture of Burundi
 List of Burundians

Other uses
 Barundi, Punjab, a village in the Ludhiana district of the state of Punjab in India.